The British independent record label Stiff Records has released 259 singles and 65 albums on general release in the United Kingdom with a prefix catalogue number of BUY and SEEZ respectively. Just under a quarter of all BUY singles releases charted in the UK Singles Chart and 22 of these have gone on to receive either a silver or gold disc from the British Phonographic Industry (BPI). Over one third of all SEEZ albums releases charted in the UK Albums Chart and 13 of these have gone on to receive either a silver, gold or platinum disc from the BPI. This list excludes non-BUY singles catalogue numbers such as DAMNED 1 ("Stretcher Case Baby" by The Damned), DEV 1 ("Jocko Homo" by Devo) and NY 7 ("Fairytale of New York" by The Pogues and Kirsty MacColl). It also excludes non-SEEZ album catalogue numbers such as FIST 1 (Hits Greatest Stiffs), GET 1 (Live Stiffs Live), and LENE 1 (Lene Lovich Speaks by Lene Lovich).   

Damned Damned Damned (SEEZ 1) by The Damned was the first full-length album released by a UK punk group and "New Rose" (BUY 6) was the first single by a UK punk group. Other artists to have released singles or albums on BUY or SEEZ catalogue numbers include Elvis Costello, Madness,
Ian Dury, Motörhead, Nick Lowe, Jona Lewie, Tracey Ullman, Desmond Dekker and Alvin Stardust.

This list also includes promotional singles that are generally distributed without charge to DJs and music journalists in advance of its general release, which is distributed commercially to the general public. A plug copy is another name for a promotional recording.

Key

 Denotes that a silver disc was awarded in the UK for either 200,000 singles sold or 60,000 albums sold.
 Denotes that a gold disc was awarded in the UK for either 400,000 singles sold or 100,000 albums sold.
 Denotes that a platinum disc was awarded in the UK for either 600,000 singles sold or 300,000 albums sold.

See also
 Music recording sales certification
 List of music recording certifications
 British Phonographic Industry
 Official Charts Company

References

Citations

General references (sources)
45cat.com
stiff-records.com
Stiff discography site
Be Stiff: The Stiff Records Story
fonorama.cz
Official Charts Company 
BPI - British Recorded Music Industry

Further reading

External links
 The Official Stiff Records Site
 Stiff Records discography at Discogs

 
Discographies of British record labels
Stiff Records
Stiff Records singles
Stiff Records albums